Joel Anderson (born February 11, 1960) is an American politician serving as a member of the San Diego County Board of Supervisors. A Republican, he is a former California state senator, assemblyperson, and board member of a municipal water district. During his time in the Legislature, Anderson served on the board of the American Legislative Exchange Council (ALEC) as California state chair.

Early life and education

Born and raised in Detroit, Anderson moved to San Diego County, California with his family when he was in high school. Anderson graduated from Grossmont College with an associate's degree in business administration. He attended California State Polytechnic University, Pomona, and received a bachelor's degree in finance and business administration from the university. He has served within his community as treasurer on the board of the Resource Conservation District of Greater San Diego County, a member of the board of the Water Conservation Garden, director of proceedings of the Alpine Chamber of Commerce, and as a volunteer at River Valley Charter High School.

Political career

San Diego activism
In 1998, Anderson campaigned for a seat in the California Assembly but lost the election. In November 2002, he was elected to the Division 5 seat on the Padre Dam Board—representing Blossom Valley, Flinn Springs, Alpine, Crest and Harbison Canyon—with 44 percent of the vote while campaigning on the issues of fiscal responsibility and decreasing spending. Anderson criticized incumbent members of the board for excessive travel and for putting together a customer service center that cost more than he believed was necessary. After Anderson was elected, the Padre Dam Board voted unanimously to postpone the building project. In August 2003, the Padre Dam Board voted to build a new office building at the Santee Lakes Recreation Preserve; Anderson voted against the spending measure, and it passed 3–2 with a cost limit of $6 million. In 2006, Anderson was the Board President of the Padre Dam Water Board.

California State Assembly (2006–2010)
Anderson was elected to the California Assembly in 2006, as a representative of the 77th Assembly District in East San Diego County, California. His campaign issues included border security, combating illegal immigration, decreasing taxes and fighting government waste, and promoting Jessica's Law in order to prevent sex offenders residing nearby educational facilities and local parks. He received endorsements in his 2006 campaign, from Republican politicians in San Diego County including Ray Haynes, State Senator Bill Morrow, and Assemblyman Mark Wyland. Helped by those endorsements, he narrowly won a five-candidate primary over Santee City Councilman Jack Dale by 858 votes, which was tantamount to victory in the general election.

In 2007, Anderson wrote legislation in the California Assembly which mandated that the two main pension funds in the state must divest from businesses that conduct defense or energy affairs in Iran. The bill required the California Public Employees' Retirement System and the California State Teachers' Retirement System to divest from companies that violated federal law by doing business in the Islamic Republic of Iran. This legislation called for the divestment of more than $24 billion of our public pensions from the Islamic Republic of Iran. This proposal garnered Anderson notice on a national level. AB 221, the California Divest Iran Act, was co-authored by fellow legislators from both main political parties. The bill focused on the California Public Employees' Retirement System (CalPERS) and the California State Teachers' Retirement System (CalSTRS), and ordered them to divest from businesses in Iran. Governor Schwarzenegger spoke favorably of Anderson's legislation, and acknowledged that the state should position itself to have a "powerful stand against terrorism". In a statement about AB 221, the Governor said, "California has a long history of leadership and doing what's right with our investment portfolio." Governor Schwarzenegger said he would sign AB 221 on the floor of the United Nations during his speech to the General Assembly. Sherry Reser, spokeswoman for CalSTRS said that the pension fund "will never tolerate support of terrorism", and acknowledged, "We will implement the bill." James Hawley, co-director of the Elfenworks Center for the Study of Fiduciary Capitalism at St. Mary's College in Moraga, California, predicted that Anderson's legislation would affect other state governments, "There is political pressure out there. This is going to resonate with a lot of state legislatures." Anderson's bill received support from both Jewish and Iranian groups in California. Associated Dean of the Simon Wiesenthal Center Rabbi Abraham Cooper commented, "The Iranian regime is up to no good. The only thing that is going to derail them is to hit them in the pocketbook." Upon news that the Governor would sign the bill, Anderson stated, "This is a common sense bill. Money is the mother's milk of terrorism."

Anderson proposed legislation in 2007 to give disabled veterans a free pass to attend state parks. The bill passed the Assembly with a 73-0 vote. Democratic State Senator Christine Kehoe commented in favor of the legislation, "It's the public's way of saying thank you." Vietnam War veteran and Dana Point, California resident Bill Manes noted, "It's just a nice gesture, particularly for those men and women coming back now." Anderson put forth an amendment intended to give the same parks benefit to those that had received the Medal of Honor. State Senator Darrell Steinberg, a Democrat and the Chairman of the Senate Natural Resources and Water Committee, commented in favor of this amendment, "I'm certainly in favor of extending the privilege to recipients of the Medal of Honor. That makes complete sense." On July 27, 2007, Governor Arnold Schwarzenegger signed the legislation into law, as Senate Bill 60. Upon signing the bill, Governor Schwarzenegger stated, "We owe our veterans a tremendous debt of gratitude for the contributions they have made to our state and for their dedicated service to our country. This bill is an important step forward in ensuring that these homes become a reality for our many veterans who need them."

In March 2008, Anderson endorsed Duncan D. Hunter, the son of Congressman Duncan Hunter, in his campaign for the United States House of Representatives. Anderson also served as the chairman of the junior Hunter's congressional campaign. Anderson and his daughter Mary spoke up in support of home schooling in March 2008, after a state appellate court in California issued a ruling that children who are the product of home schooling need to be credentialed. Anderson proposed legislation in the Assembly, ACR 115, which requested of the California Supreme Court to overturn the precedent of the lower court. In 2008, Anderson brought the issue of divestment of funding from businesses related to Iran to the educational institution of the University of California. He brought forward a resolution, ACR 79, which called upon the university to divest its funding and investments relating to any corporations that conduct business operations with Iran. In May 2008, the resolution had successfully passed through the Assembly Appropriations Committee. Anderson commented, "as a matter of human rights, it is the right thing to do" to divest from Iran, and also noted it was a fiscally responsible decision.

In 2009, California Governor Arnold Schwarzenegger signed two bills proposed by Anderson into state law: a piece of legislation which assisted home-schooled children in getting work permits, and another bill that protected some of an individual's equity in their home from liability. In February 2009, Anderson proposed legislation, AB-255, that would mandate blurring detail on Google Earth images of areas deemed sensitive locations including schools, places of worship, government buildings and medical facilities. When asked how he had determined the list of locations proposed to be blurred, Anderson commented, "Well, I looked at where we've had security issues in the past and potentially, might have issues in the future. Churches and synagogues have been bombed. So have federal buildings and then, of course, 9/11. So, the threats are out there and as a state legislator, public safety is my No. 1 job. To ignore that fact would be irresponsible."

In March 2009, Anderson opposed a non-binding resolution that declared the process flawed by which Proposition 8, which had made same-sex marriage unconstitutional in California, was adopted, and described same-sex marriage as discriminatory towards heterosexual marriage. Anderson received a zero percent scorecard rating from gay rights group Equality California for the years 2007 through 2012.

Anderson introduced legislation in 2009 regarding a concern over California's use of IOUs: AB 1506 proposed to allow individuals to utilize California state issued IOUs in order to fund payments towards university education, car payments, and payroll taxes. Anderson said of the proposed legislation, "Hopefully, this will allow California businesses to stay alive while the state is unable to pay them." The bill would mandate that the state must accept its own registered warrants as payment. The bill was considered by the Assembly Business and Professions Committee in July 2009. The bill received unanimous support from the Assembly Business and Professions Committee, as well as bipartisan support from both Republicans and from Democrats in the majority. Democratic leadership member in the Assembly, John Perez, commented favorably on Anderson's proposed legislation, "It is the recipients of these IOUs who are being punished for the actions of the governor and others who have gotten us into this situation. I appreciate what you're attempting to do here." After the July 7, 2009 vote by the Assembly Business and Professions Committee, the bill was sent to the Appropriations Committee. Dr. Stuart A. Cohen, president of the San Diego County Medical Society, wrote to Anderson in support of the legislation, acknowledging, "This bill would save many businesses and individuals from severe financial hardship."

Anderson was the only Assembly member to vote against AB2199, which would remove "the causes and cures of homosexuality" from the list of mental illnesses and sexual deviancies to be researched by the State Department of Mental Health.

In an August 2009 interview with The San Diego Union-Tribune, Anderson identified private sector growth as a solution to decreasing unemployment and fixing the budget in California, and noted, "The long-term answer to the budget is to grow private-sector jobs as quickly as possible while stopping all new spending. My colleagues and I are committed to rolling back high taxes and oppressive regulation on businesses, thus encouraging new private-sector jobs." He characterized "a clean spending cap [as] the single most important reform for California that could be passed in a ballot initiative". On September 12, 2009, Anderson was recognized at a gala event "Night To Honor Israel" with the "Watchman on the Wall" Award from the organization Christians United for Israel. The organization recognized Anderson as the Assemblyman, "who spearheaded California's Iran Divestment initiative".

In December 2009, Anderson was fined US$20,000 by the Fair Political Practices Commission in California, relating to solicitations of contributions towards a campaign higher than the legally allowed amount. In an interview about the fine, Anderson stated, "I made the mistakes, and I corrected them as quickly as possible. We didn't spend the money. Once I realized there was a mistake, we went straight to the FPPC and tried to reconcile it."

California State Senate (2010–2018)
On March 3, 2010, Anderson announced his intention to run for the California State Senate seat. Other candidates in the Republican primary election included Judge Advocate General's Corps, U.S. Air Force retired Lieutenant Colonel and Murrieta, California School Board member Kenneth Dickson, and Riverside County Supervisor Jeff Stone. In a statement upon declaring his intention to run for California State Senate, Anderson noted, "Over the last three years I've carried major legislation. I've worked hard in a bipartisan way to solve California's problems. We have solutions to California's problems, but they aren't all politically correct. I want to be part of that solution."

In the Republican primary for the State Senate, Anderson received endorsements from San Diego Assemblyman Nathan Fletcher, the California Republican Assembly, Congressman Duncan Hunter, the San Diego Deputy Sheriff's Association, Assembly member Martin Garrick, and San Diego City Attorney Jan Goldsmith.

On June 8, 2010, the day of the Republican primary for the State Senate seat, the Associated Press reported: "Assemblyman Joel Anderson, R-La Mesa, was the early leader to succeed Senate Minority Leader Dennis Hollingsworth". The Press-Enterprise noted, "Assemblyman Joel Anderson, R-Alpine, was on pace to top a four-person field in the GOP primary for the 36th Senate District". The North County Times reported that Anderson led the candidates in the Republican primary, with his closest opponent receiving 24 percent of the vote. The San Diego Union-Tribune reported that Anderson had a "strong lead over his Republican competitors in the East County 36th State Senate District primary race".

According to the paper, with 15 percent of votes counted, Anderson received 45 percent of the votes; other candidates in the Republican primary received 25, 21, and 10 percent. East County Magazine, and The San Diego Union-Tribune declared Anderson the winner of the Republican primary in the State Senate election. In an error compared to "Dewey Defeats Truman", the publication Valley News of Riverside County, California, erroneously reported that Anderson had lost the primary. The publisher of Valley News had only obtained the results from Riverside, and not the entire district. The Valley News later posted a new article with the correct results, and deleted the prior incorrect reporting without posting a correction. The State Senate district is considered a "Republican stronghold"; the Democratic candidate in the general election was Paul Clay, who ran uncontested in the primary.

Anderson won the general election by a wide margin.

During his term in the Senate, he has opposed any legislation controlling the sale of guns or ammunition. He opposed increased aid to pregnant teens, voted to prevent registered nurses from dispensing contraceptives, and wanted to prevent the inclusion of maternity services in health insurance plans sold in the state. He voted against the minimum wage increase more than once, he opposed requiring overtime pay for agricultural workers, opposes health warning labels on sugary drinks, opposed the sale of medical marijuana, opposed notifying property owners prior to the start of hydraulic fracking on their leased lands, voted not to ban the carcinogen BPA in baby products, voted against requiring mental health coverage by health insurers doing business in the state, voted against the solar power energy credit, voted to keep gender based health insurance pricing so that women would have to pay more for health insurance, and voted to allow the resale of recalled products. He also voted against changing school start times, a statewide sanctuary policy, and recognizing non-binary as a legal gender. On June 1, 2017, he voted against a bill to create a single-payer health plan for the state of California.

On July 20, 2017, Anderson introduced Resolution SJR-10, a resolution condemning the persecution of Falun Gong taking place in the People's Republic of China to the Committee of Rules. It unanimously passed a vote of the Judiciary Committee on August 29.

On August 30, members of the senate received a letter on the stationary of the Chinese Consulate of San Francisco urging the California senators not to support SJR-10, "so as not to sabotage the friendship and sustainable development between California and China." The letter goes further, pointing out the strong economic ties between China and California, such as the high volume of tourism, trade, and overseas students studying in California. The following day, September 1, the resolution was voted on and sent back to the rules committee, blocking it from being voted on in the Senate.

In August 2018, Anderson was accused of physically and verbally harassing Stephanie Roberson at a fund raising event for the California Nurses Association. Roberson, the association’s Government Relations Director, complained to the Senate Rules Committee that an intoxicated Joel Anderson repeatedly threatened to "bitch slap" her. The threats were witnessed by several people and Anderson was escorted off the premises by restaurant staff.

In September 2018 he was officially reprimanded by the California Nurses Association for sexually harassing a lobbyist.

2018 California State Board of Equalization election

On February 1, 2018, Anderson announced that he will be a candidate for the California Board of Equalization, district 4. In a major surprise, he was narrowly defeated by former San Diego City Councilman Mike Schaefer.

San Diego County Board of Supervisors (2021–present)

On February 26, 2020, Anderson announced his candidacy for the San Diego County Board of Supervisors and campaigned as a Trump Republican. In the March 3 primary, Anderson finished first place with 35.5% of the vote. Anderson received an endorsement from the San Diego Gun Owners PAC, the same organization that successfully sued to overturn the assault rifle ban (currently under appeal).

In the November general election, he defeated fellow Republican Poway Mayor Steve Vaus by a margin of 282 votes, or less than 0.1 percent of votes cast.

Personal life 
Anderson and his wife, Kate, have three children. In 2010, Anderson and his family resided in Alpine, California.

References

External links

Joel Anderson, JoinCalifornia

1960 births
21st-century American politicians
Businesspeople from Detroit
California State Polytechnic University, Pomona alumni
Republican Party California state senators
Living people
Republican Party members of the California State Assembly
Politicians from Detroit
People from El Cajon, California
People from Alpine, California
San Diego County Board of Supervisors members